Andrés González Cardero (born 2 March 1988), simply known as Andrés, is a Spanish footballer who plays for Burgos CF Promesas as a right back.

Club career
Born in Burgos, Castile and León, González made his senior debuts with local UDG Río Vena in the 2006–07 season, in the regional leagues. He moved straight to Segunda División B in 2007, after agreeing to a contract with Burgos CF.

On 7 August 2009, González signed for SD Eibar also in the third level. The following 14 July, after being a regular starter, he moved to Segunda División side UD Salamanca. 

A fourth-choice behind Sito, Anaitz Arbilla and Juanpa, Andrés only made his professional debut on 4 June 2011, starting in a 2–2 home draw against CD Numancia as his side suffered relegation. In the following campaign, he was an undisputed starter.

In August 2012, González moved to Racing de Santander B in the third division, suffering team relegation in his only season at the club. He subsequently returned to Burgos, being a first-choice in the following campaigns.

References

External links
Burgos official profile 

1988 births
Living people
Sportspeople from Burgos
Spanish footballers
Association football defenders
Segunda División players
Segunda División B players
Tercera División players
Burgos CF footballers
SD Eibar footballers
UD Salamanca players
Rayo Cantabria players
CD Guijuelo footballers
Burgos CF Promesas players